Birgit Peter (born 27 January 1964) is a German rower, and double Olympic gold medalist.

Life and career
Peter was born in Potsdam, East Germany. She competed for the SG Dynamo Potsdam / Sportvereinigung (SV) Dynamo, and she won medals at various international rowing competitions. In October 1986, she was awarded a Patriotic Order of Merit in gold (first class) for her sporting success. The Olympic gold medal that she won in 1988 in the double sculls teamed up with Martina Schröter was the 500th Olympic medal won by East Germany.

References

1964 births
Living people
East German female rowers
German female rowers
Olympic rowers of East Germany
Olympic rowers of Germany
Olympic gold medalists for East Germany
Olympic gold medalists for Germany
Olympic medalists in rowing
Rowers at the 1988 Summer Olympics
Rowers at the 1992 Summer Olympics
Medalists at the 1988 Summer Olympics
Medalists at the 1992 Summer Olympics
World Rowing Championships medalists for East Germany
Sportspeople from Potsdam
Recipients of the Patriotic Order of Merit in gold